1986–87 Országos Bajnokság I (men's water polo) was the 81st water polo championship in Hungary. Fourteen teams played each other twice for the title.

Final list 

* M: Matches W: Win D: Drawn L: Lost G+: Goals earned G-: Goals got P: Point

Season statistics

Number of teams by counties

Sources 
Gyarmati Dezső: Aranykor (Hérodotosz Könyvkiadó és Értékesítő Bt., Budapest, 2002.)
A magyar sport évkönyve 1987

1986 in water polo
1986 in Hungarian sport
Seasons in Hungarian water polo competitions
1987 in water polo
1987 in Hungarian sport